The 2019–20 Liga III was the 64th season of Liga III, the third tier of the Romanian football league system. The season was initially scheduled to begin on 24 August 2019 and to end on 30 May 2020. 

The season was interrupted on 9 March 2020, after 16 rounds, due to the COVID-19 pandemic. After two months of inactivity, on 11 May 2020, the Romanian Football Federation announced that the season was discontinued and the best ranked teams from each series (after 16 rounds) were promoted to Liga II, only if the distance between the leader and the runner-up was bigger than 3 points. Otherwise promotion play-offs will be played between the best two teams of the series. No teams were relegated this season, apart from the clubs that were already dissolved or excluded (CSU Galați, Tractorul Cetate and Național Sebiș).



Team changes

To Liga III
Promoted from Liga IV
 Blejoi  (debut)
 CSM Bacău  (debut)
 CSM Slatina  (after 8 years of absence)
 CSU Galați  (after 39 years of absence)
 Fortuna Becicherecu Mic  (debut)
 Gilortul Târgu Cărbunești  (after 13 years of absence)
 Hușana Huși  (after 7 years of absence)
 Mostiștea Ulmu  (after 7 years of absence)
 Ozana Târgu Neamț  (after 3 years of absence)
 Poseidon Limanu  (debut)
 Progresul Pecica  (after 18 years of absence)
 Recolta Gh. Doja  (debut)
 Sânmartin  (after 4 years of absence)
 Tractorul Cetate  (debut)
 Unirea Mirșid  (debut)
 Viitorul Dăești  (debut)
 Viitorul Ianca  (after 9 years of absence)
 Viitorul Șelimbăr  (debut)

Relegated from Liga II
 Luceafărul Oradea  (after 3 years of absence)
 Aerostar Bacău  (after 1 year of absence)
 ACS Poli Timișoara  (debut)
 Balotești  (after 5 years of absence)
 Dacia Unirea Brăila  (after 9 years of absence)

From Liga III
Relegated to Liga IV
 Unirea Tășnad  (ended 2-year stay)
 Sportul Chiscani  (ended 3-year stay) 
 Millenium Giarmata  (ended 10-year stay)
 Oltenița  (ended 4-year stay)
 MSE Târgu Mureș  (ended 1-year stay)
 Râmnicu Sărat  (ended 4-year stay)
 Hermannstadt II  (ended 2-year stay)
 Gaz Metan II Mediaș  (ended 3-year stay)
 Lugoj  (ended 7-year stay)
 Sănătatea Darabani  (ended 2-year stay)
 Iernut  (ended 5-year stay)
 Ocna Mureș  (ended 1-year stay)
 Viitorul Domnești  (ended 9-year stay)
 Delta Dobrogea Tulcea  (ended 5-year stay)
 Roman  (ended 13-year stay)
 Bragadiru  (ended 1-year stay)

Promoted to Liga II
 SCM Gloria Buzău  (ended 1-year stay)
 Rapid București  (ended 1-year stay)
 Turris Turnu Măgurele  (ended 2-year stay)
 CSMȘ Reșița  (ended 3-year stay)
 Miercurea Ciuc  (ended 5-year stay)

Excluded teams
Avrig, CSM Târgu Mureș, Hărman and Stăruința Zagon withdrew due to financial problems.

Satu Mare was excluded by the Romanian Football Federation.

Teams spared from relegation
Energeticianul was spared from relegation to Liga III due to withdrawal of Luceafărul Oradea.

Agricola Borcea, Cetate Deva, Atletic Bradu, Pașcani and Sporting Roșiori were spared from relegation to Liga IV.

Renamed teams and other changes
Unirea Mirșid was replaced by the newly formed SCM Zalău, after an agreement between the two clubs.

Atletic Bradu was merged with Vedița Colonești. Vedița took the place of Atletic in the third tier.

Other teams
Luceafărul Oradea withdrew from Liga II after the end of the last season and was enrolled instead in the Liga III, a move made due to financial reasons.

League tables

Seria I

Season results

Seria II

Season results

Seria III

Season results

Seria IV

Season results

Seria V

Season results

Promotion play-offs
After the season was discontinued, the best ranked teams from each series (after 16 rounds) were promoted to Liga II, only if the distance between the leader and the runner-up was bigger than 3 points. Otherwise promotion play-offs will be played between the best two teams of the series.

References

2019
3
Romania
Association football events postponed due to the COVID-19 pandemic